Ilha Tupinambarana is a former fluvial island bordered by rivers of the Amazon system (Amazon, Madeira, Sucunduri, and Abacaxis) in eastern Amazonas, Brazil.  It has been split into four completely separate parts by natural channels, just like those isolating it from the mainland.  The original island stretched from the municipalities of Parintins, in the northeast, to Nova Olinda do Norte, in the southwest. The combined area of the islands is to 11,850 km², making Ilha Tupinambarana the second largest fluvial group of islands in the world after Bananal Island. It is also the 92nd largest island in the world and the 3rd largest island in Brazil.

River islands of Brazil
Islands of the Amazon
Landforms of Amazonas (Brazilian state)